Sheikh-ul-Hadees Dr. Syed Sher Ali Shah Madani (31 December 1930 – 30 November 2015) (Pashto: سید شیر علی شاہ مدنی) was a Pashtun Islamic scholar.

Education 
The Sheikh began learning from home, learned the Qur’an, fundamental books in Arabic and Persian with his father (Maulana Qudrat Shah) and some books of Persian poetry from Hazrat Maulana Abdul Rahim, and "Nahw and Sarf" (Arabic Grammar) from Hazrat Maulana Qazi Habib-ur-Rehman. After that, he joined the Darul Uloom Haqqania in Akora Khattak. About three months after graduating from Darul Uloom Haqqania, he also studied from the teachers of Jamia Ashrafia Lahore, Sheikh Tafsir Maulana Muhammad Idris Kandhlawi and Hazrat Maulana Mufti Muhammad Hassan.

Career 
On 5 April 1954, he started teaching in Darul Uloom Haqqania in Akora Khattak after graduation. After 20 years of teaching, on the advice of Shaykh-ul-Hadeeth Maulana Abdul Haq Akorwi, he entered the Islamic University of Madinah in 1973 and studied in various fields for fifteen years and got his Master and Ph.D. degrees. He also continued teaching in the Masjid e Nabawi. After graduating from the Islamic University of Madinah, he was appointed as a teacher in Jamia Darul Uloom, Karachi in 1987. Later, he also taught in Mufti Zar Wali Khan's Madrasa Jamia Ahsan-ul-Uloom Gulshan-e-Iqbal Karachi and Maulana Jalaluddin Haqqani's Madrasa Manba-ul-Uloom, Miramshah. Finally, at the invitation of his longtime colleague Shaykh-ul-Hadeeth Maulana Sami-ul-Haq in 1996 he came and started teaching Hadith at Darul Uloom Haqqania.

Death 
He died on Friday 30 October 2015, at Rehman Medical Complex, Peshawar. And on 31 October, millions of people, scholars, shaykhs, saints and students attended the funeral and were buried beside their father.

References

1930 births
2015 deaths
People from Nowshera District
Pakistani Islamic religious leaders
Pakistani Sunni Muslim scholars of Islam
Muslim missionaries
Darul Uloom Haqqania alumni
Islamic University of Madinah alumni
Deobandis